San Francisco de los Romo is a municipality and city in the Mexican state of Aguascalientes. The city of San Francisco de los Romo serves as the municipal seat for the surrounding municipality of San Francisco de los Romo.

It is located in the middle of the Aguascalientes Valley, at 20 km towards north from the state capital Aguascalientes; it adjoins with the municipalities of Pabellón de Arteaga and Asientos to the north, Jesús María to the west, and Aguascalientes to the south-east. The city, which is the state's sixth-largest community, is located at the northwest corner of the municipality.

Demographics

As of 2010, the municipality had a total population of 35,769.

As of 2010, the city of San Francisco de los Romo had a population of 16,124. Other than the city of San Francisco de los Romo, the municipality had 117 localities, the largest of which (with 2010 populations in parentheses) were: Ex-viñedos Guadalupe (3,499), classified as urban, and Colonia Macario J. Gómez (2,122), Puertecito de la Virgen (1,976), Paseos de la Providencia (1,867), La Concepción (1,483), and La Escondida (El Salero) (1,318), classified as rural.

San Francisco de los Romo is the sixth-largest community in the state, is located at the northwest corner of the municipality and serves as its municipal seat.

Climate

References
 Link to tables of population data from Census of 2005 Instituto Nacional de Estadística, Geografía e Informática (INEGI)
 Aguascalientes Enciclopedia de los Municipios de México

External links
Ayuntamiento de San Francisco de los Romo Official website
Gobierno del Estado de Aguascalientes Official website of State of Aguascalientes

Populated places in Aguascalientes
Municipalities of Aguascalientes